Ove Emanuelsson (24 May 1941 – 19 June 2021) was a Swedish sprint canoer who competed in the 1960s. Competing in three Summer Olympics, he earned his best finish of fourth in the C-1 1000 m event in Italy during the 1960 Summer Olympics.

References

External links
Sports-reference.com profile

1941 births
2021 deaths
Canoeists at the 1960 Summer Olympics
Canoeists at the 1964 Summer Olympics
Canoeists at the 1968 Summer Olympics
Olympic canoeists of Sweden
Swedish male canoeists